The 1993 Rutgers Scarlet Knights football team represented Rutgers University in the 1993 NCAA Division I-A football season. In their fourth season under head coach Doug Graber, the Scarlet Knights compiled a 4–7 record, outscored their opponents 351 to 334, and finished in seventh place in the Big East Conference. The team's statistical leaders included Ray Lucas with 1,011 passing yards, Terrell Willis with 1,261 rushing yards, and Chris Brantley with 589 receiving yards.

Schedule

References

Rutgers
Rutgers Scarlet Knights football seasons
Rutgers Scarlet Knights football